A Heart Plays False is a 1953 West German drama film directed by Rudolf Jugert and starring O.W. Fischer, Ruth Leuwerik and Carl Wery. It was shot at the Bavaria Studios in Munich. The film's sets were designed by the art directors Franz Bi and Botho Hoefer.

Cast
 O.W. Fischer as Peter van Booven
 Ruth Leuwerik as Sybilla Zander
 Carl Wery as Professor Linz
 Gertrud Kückelmann as Gerda Peters
 Günther Lüders as Kersten
 Lina Carstens as Mutter Pratsch
 Ernst Fritz Fürbringer
 Rolf von Nauckhoff as Direktor Hersbach
 Hermann Speelmans as Matz
 Gert Fröbe as Briefüberbringer
 Rudolf Vogel as Charles
 Otto Arneth as Dr. Hersbachs Bruder
 Rainer Penkert as Dr. Neumeister
 Hedwig Wangel as Mummie
 Doris Kirchner as Kellnerin
 Petra Unkel
 Greta Keller as Chansonniere / Cabaret Singer

References

Bibliography

External links 
 

1953 films
West German films
German drama films
1953 drama films
1950s German-language films
Films directed by Rudolf Jugert
Films based on German novels
Bavaria Film films
German black-and-white films
1950s German films
Films shot at Bavaria Studios